Millennium English High School (SSC Board) is a school in Kalyan, Maharashtra, India.

About
Millennium English High School is directed by N.S.M.S. The school foundation was laid in July 2000 and got recognition by 2001 on permanent without grant basis, to the people of society who were rejected by other school only because they belonged to financial backward class category.
The roots of school and trust were laid by Honorable founder Mrs. Neerja R. Mishra. 
Millennium English School is a co-educational public school managed by Nirmal Seva Mahila Sanstha, established in 1992 is registered under Charitable Commissioner. Trust has received 80 G registration certificate. Trust runs various social activities, educational institute, women empowerment activities. The school is located in Rambaug Area of Kalyan West.

Education in Kalyan-Dombivli
Schools in Thane district